Eucalyptus costuligera is a species of small tree that is endemic to the Kimberley region of Western Australia. It has short-fibrous or flaky bark on the trunk and branches, bluish, lance-shaped adult leaves, club-shaped flower buds in branched or unbranched inflorescences with the buds in groups of up to seven, creamy-white flowers and conical, cup-shaped or pear-shaped fruit.

Description
The operculum is hemispherical, about half as long as the floral cup.

Taxonomy and naming
Eucalyptus costuligera was first formally described in 2000 by Lawrie Johnson and Ken Hill from a specimen collected  from the Derby-Gibb River Road, on the road to Wyndham. The specific epithet (costuligera) is derived from the Latin costula, meaning "a costule or rib" (strictly the midrib of a fern frond) and -ger meaning "-bearing", referring to the finely ribbed fruit.

Distribution and habitat
This eucalypt has a limited range but is abundant in a small area in the central Kimberley region of Western Australia, growing in savannah woodland in sandy to loamy soils over laterite.

Conservation status
This species is classified as is classified as "Priority One" by the Government of Western Australia Department of Parks and Wildlife meaning that it is known from only one or a few locations which are potentially at risk.

See also
List of Eucalyptus species

References

Eucalypts of Western Australia
Trees of Australia
costuligera
Myrtales of Australia
Plants described in 2000
Taxa named by Lawrence Alexander Sidney Johnson
Taxa named by Ken Hill (botanist)